Sphaleroptera alpicolana is a moth species belonging to the subfamily Tortricinae of the family Tortricidae.

It is the only accepted species of its genus Sphaleroptera, but some authors do not consider it distinct from its relative Cnephasia.

See also
List of Tortricidae genera

References

External links
tortricidae.com

Tortricinae
Tortricidae of Europe
Moths described in 1830